Karl Meyer may refer to:

Karl Meyer (activist) (born 1937), American pacifist, activist, Catholic worker and tax resister
Karl Meyer (aviator) (1894–1917), World War I flying ace
Karl Meyer (biochemist) (1899–1990), German biochemist
Karl Meyer (businessman) (1888–1971), Norwegian businessman, stockbroker and fascist
Karl A. Meyer (born 1958), Swiss Artist
Karl E. Meyer (1937–2019), American journalist
Karl Friedrich Meyer (1884–1974), Swiss-born American pathologist
Karl Meyer class seaplane tender, a Second World War-era ship

See also
Karl Mayer (character), a fictional character on the U.S. TV series Desperate Housewives
Karl Mayer (poet) (1786–1870), German poet
Carl Meyer (disambiguation)
Carl Mayer (disambiguation)